The 1896 United States presidential election in New Jersey took place on November 3, 1896. Voters chose 10 representatives, or electors to the Electoral College, who voted for president and vice president.

New Jersey voted for the Republican nominee, former governor of Ohio William McKinley, over the Democratic nominee, former U.S. Representative from Nebraska William Jennings Bryan. McKinley won the state by a margin of 23.66%, making him the first Republican presidential candidate since Ulysses S. Grant in 1872 to carry the state.

Bryan, running on a platform of free silver, appealed strongly to Western miners and farmers in the 1896 election, but had little appeal in Northeastern states like New Jersey.

This was a realigning election for New Jersey, as it was for the nation. From 1852 to 1892, the Democrats had carried the state all but once – in Ulysses Grant's 1872 landslide – and only in 1860 had any other candidates won any electoral votes at all. New Jersey, as an industrial Mid-Atlantic state, was strongly in favor of the gold standard. Up until 1896, the Democrats had nominated candidates favorable to that notion, and to the state at large. In the ten elections between 1852 and 1892, the Democrats nominated a New Yorker in six (Horatio Seymour in 1868, Horace Greeley in 1872, Samuel Tilden in 1876, and Grover Cleveland in 1884, 1888, and 1892). In another three, a candidate from another Mid-Atlantic state was nominated by the Democrats: James Buchanan and Winfield Hancock of Pennsylvania in 1856 and 1880, and New Jersey's own George McClellan in 1864. The only exception occurred in 1860 when the Democrats were completely split between Breckinridge and Douglas.

Beginning in 1896, the Democratic party dramatically shifted away from supporting business interests to supporting the interests of farmers and miners of the south and west. As the issue of bimetallism – whether to allow silver to be used as currency in addition to gold – split the country along regional boundaries, New Jersey went with the pro-gold standard and pro-business Republicans. In the ensuing "System of 1896" that lasted until the Great Depression realignment of 1932, Republicans won the state in all but one election: when New Jersey's own governor, Woodrow Wilson, was the Democratic nominee in 1912. Even then, Wilson was barely able to overcome New Jersey's Republican lean, winning with a tiny plurality of 41.20 percent of the vote due to the Republican split between Progressive Teddy Roosevelt and conservative William Howard Taft.

Beyond even the 4th party system, New Jersey retained the Republican bent it acquired in 1896 for the next century: in the twentieth century, Democrats only won New Jersey nine times, while Republicans won sixteen times. On all but three of these occasions (the Democratic landslides of 1936, 1964, and 1996) the margin of victory was less than 10 points. Even Franklin Roosevelt only barely won the state in 1932, 1940, and 1944. Beginning with Bill Clinton's massive victory in 1996, the state would return to the Democratic fold with the rest of the Northeast during the twenty-first century.

Results

Results by county

See also
 United States presidential elections in New Jersey

References

New Jersey
1896
1896 New Jersey elections